Parley voo or parlay Voo is an English transliteration of French parlez-vous, part of the larger phrase parlez-vous français? meaning "do you speak French?". The term is sometimes used humorously in English as a verb meaning "to speak a foreign language, particularly French".

Parley voo or parlay voo may also refer to:

 A parley
 "Mademoiselle from Armentières", a song popular during the First World War also known by its chorus, "Hinky Dinky Parley-Voo" or "Hinky Dinky Parlay-Voo"
 Mademoiselle Parley Voo, a 1928 British silent drama film

See also

 Parlez vous (disambiguation)
 Parley (disambiguation)
 Voo (disambiguation)